Chatham Channel is a strait and marine passageway on the coast of British Columbia.  It leads from the lower reaches of Knight Inlet to the opening of Call Inlet, separating Minstrel and East Cracroft Islands from the mainland to the east. From the opening of Call Inlet, running south then east around East Cracroft, is Havannah Channel.

Name origin

References

Straits of British Columbia
Central Coast of British Columbia